Bahirdia Mansa Union is an Union Parishad under Fakirhat Upazila of Bagerhat District in the division of Khulna, Bangladesh. It has an area of 43.62 km2 (16.84 sq mi) and a population of 14,368.

Villages 
 Mansa
 Mansa / Attaka
 Attaka
 West Bahiridia
 Mid Bahiridia
 Small Bahiridia
 Hochla
 Satbariya
 Lalchandrapur

References

Unions of Fakirhat Upazila
Unions of Bagerhat District
Unions of Khulna Division